Markus Garborg Fjørtoft (born 12 January 1994) is a former professional footballer who played as a defender. He retired on 10th August 2022, after leaving Ayr United.

He is the son of former Norwegian international Jan Åge Fjørtoft.

Fjørtoft co-hosts the podcast BroPod, along with fellow footballer Ciaran McKenna. He also co-hosts The German Fussball Podcast with his father.

Career

Youth and college 
Fjørtoft played four years of college soccer at Duke University between 2014 and 2017. He made a total of 74 appearances, scoring 7 and tallying 2 assists in his time at Duke.

Professional 
On 19 January 2018, Fjørtoft was selected in the second round (45th overall) in the 2018 MLS SuperDraft by Seattle Sounders FC.

In September 2018, Fjørtoft signed with Southern United FC of New Zealand. He signed a one-year contract for Scottish club Hamilton Academical in April 2019, starting from July 2019. He extended his contract for another year in January 2020.

In September 2020, Fjørtoft joined Scottish Championship side Greenock Morton on a permanent deal.

On 27 May 2021, it was announced that he had joined Ayr United for the 2021–22 season. He left Ayr United at the end of the season. On 10 August 2022, Fjørtoft announced his retirement from professional football at the age of 28.

References

External links 

1994 births
Living people
Sportspeople from Swindon
Norwegian footballers
Association football midfielders
USL League Two players
Scottish Professional Football League players
Seattle Sounders FC draft picks
Duke Blue Devils men's soccer players
Bærum SK players
Hamilton Academical F.C. players
New York Red Bulls U-23 players
Ayr United F.C. players
Norwegian expatriate footballers
Norwegian expatriate sportspeople in the United States
Expatriate soccer players in the United States
Norwegian expatriates in New Zealand
Expatriate association footballers in New Zealand
Norwegian expatriate sportspeople in Scotland
Expatriate footballers in Scotland